Dropropizine (or dipropizine) is a cough suppressant that is sold in Germany, Central America, South America, and some African countries such as Congo. It is sold as suppositories, tablets, and syrup. It is used to stop a cough caused by allergies or a cold.

Side effects
Adverse effects include drowsiness, nausea, heartburn, and respiratory depression.

See also 
 Levodropropizine

References 

Antitussives
Phenylpiperazines
Vicinal diols